Loomis is a hamlet in Delaware County, New York, United States. It is located northwest of Walton at the corner of NY–206 and Loomis Brook Road. Loomis Brook flows southward through the hamlet.

References

Geography of Delaware County, New York
Hamlets in Delaware County, New York
Hamlets in New York (state)